Prairie Creek is a stream in Thurston County in the U.S. state of Washington. It is a tributary to the Chehalis River.

Prairie Creek was so named for the prairie near its course.

References

Rivers of Thurston County, Washington
Rivers of Washington (state)